Cracked Quack is a 1952 Warner Bros. Merrie Melodies short directed by Friz Freleng. The cartoon was released on July 5, 1952, and stars Daffy Duck and Porky Pig.

Plot
A cold and tired Daffy Duck flies through a blizzard, having flown south too late. He eventually comes to a mansion, full of mounted animal heads. Daffy sees a stuffed duck on the fireplace that looks like himself and believes "Well, there's one of our boys that's got this 'flying south' business licked!" He invites himself inside and tries to talk with the stuffed duck about spending the winter months with it, but soon believes that the "duck" is being a snob; when he gets attacked twice by it, he beats it into submission and finally realizes it is a stuffed duck. Daffy then gets an idea: believing this means he will get himself some free room and board, he puts the beat-up stuffed duck into storage.

The mansion turns out to belong to Porky Pig, who is busy going through a large amount of tax forms. His dog Rover moves to the fireplace to sleep, so Daffy quickly substitutes himself as the stuffed duck, making Rover suspicious. Hours pass and Daffy realizes "I can see where this moron is going to give me trouble", so he pushes a vase off the fireplace onto Rover causing him to yelp. It's when a fly lands on his bill and Daffy knocks it off that Rover realizes that the duck is a real one and barks at it. Porky however objects, insisting Daffy is a stuffed duck, proving it by bashing Daffy's head on the floor, leaving Daffy dazed and with lumps on his head.

Later, Daffy sneaks into the kitchen and helps himself to a roast chicken from the refrigerator. Rover however sneaks up from behind him and when Daffy notices, he takes a bone and tricks Rover into fetching it outside a window. Daffy locks the dog out and closes a blind, remarking that "I can't stand to see a dumb animal suffer". Porky lets Rover back in and scolds him for being outside, warning him he'll be thrown out if he's not careful. Later, Daffy takes the stuffed duck and waddles it into Rover's sight, who attacks it thinking it is Daffy. Porky again tells his dog off and drags Rover off to lock him away, warning him "You try that again and I'll put your tail in the pencil sharpener". After successfully getting the dog out of his way, Daffy tries to sneak away to continue his comfortable time, but Porky mistakes him for the stuffed duck and takes him away to "stuff it all over again".

As a stuffed Daffy stands over the fireplace, a flock of black ducks similar to him pass by and see him, repeating his earlier quotation. Porky, still working out his tax forms, says to himself that "This darn income tax would come out alright if I had a few dependents". Daffy asks "Did you say dependents?" and opens a door, adding "You've got 'em, brother!". To Porky's shock, the flock of ducks from earlier have invaded his home and are having a party as the cartoon ends.

Cast
Mel Blanc as Daffy Duck, Porky Pig, Duck and Fly
Jack Mercer as Rover

References

1952 animated films
1952 short films
1952 films
Merrie Melodies short films
Warner Bros. Cartoons animated short films
Short films directed by Friz Freleng
Daffy Duck films
Porky Pig films
Films scored by Carl Stalling
1950s Warner Bros. animated short films
1950s English-language films
Films set in country houses